Okaukuejo Airport  is an airport in the Oshana Region of Namibia, serving the Etosha National Park and its administrative center, Okaukuejo.

See also

List of airports in Namibia
Transport in Namibia

References

External links
 OurAirports - Okaukuejo
 OpenStreetMap - Okaukuejo
 Google Earth

Airports in Namibia